The 1954–55 season was the 82nd season of competitive football in Scotland and the 58th season of the Scottish Football League.

Aberdeen won their first League Title.

Scottish League Division A

Champions: Aberdeen
Note: There was no relegation this season with Division One being increased to 18 teams next season.

Scottish League Division B

Promoted: Airdrieonians Dunfermline

Scottish League Division C

Division disbanded. Promoted: Montrose, East Stirlingshire, Berwick Rangers, Dumbarton, Stranraer. Reserve teams placed into a separate Scottish (Reserve) League.

Cup honours

Other Honours

County

 - aggregate over two legs
 - trophy shared

Highland League

Scotland national team

Key:
 (H) = Home match
 (A) = Away match
 BHC = British Home Championship

Notes and references

External links
Scottish Football Historical Archive

 
Seasons in Scottish football